Gibraltar competed at the 2018 European Athletics Championships in Berlin, Germany, from 6–12 August 2018. The following three athletes were selected to compete by the Gibraltar Amateur Athletic Association:

References

Nations at the 2018 European Athletics Championships
Gibraltar at the European Athletics Championships
European Athletics Championships